Stanbridge Station is a municipality in the Canadian province of Quebec, located within the Brome-Missisquoi Regional County Municipality. The population as of the Canada 2011 Census was 276.

Demographics

Population
Population trend:

Language
Mother tongue language (2006)

See also
Official website of the municipality of Stanbridge-Station
List of municipalities in Quebec

References 

Municipalities in Quebec
Incorporated places in Brome-Missisquoi Regional County Municipality